helicoCARE direct is a Helicobacter pylori whole-blood antibody test that was introduced worldwide in 2006. It is manufactured by CARE diagnostica. It is an immunochromatographic test which detects the presence of antibodies against H. Pylori in whole-blood samples. This test is suitable for screening large populations for peptic ulcer disease.

References

Infectious disease blood tests
Helicobacter pylori